One Mo Nigga ta Go is the only solo studio album by former N.W.A member DJ Yella. It was released on March 26, 1996, and is dedicated to Eazy-E. The album cover shows close-up of Eazy-E's face and Yella himself at Eazy-E's grave.

Recording sessions took place at Audio Achievements in Torrance, California with Donovan "The Dirt Biker" Smith, who also provided mixing and co-production. Production was handled primarily by DJ Yella himself. The album features guest appearances from B.G. Knocc Out & Dresta, Kokane, Dirty Red, Traci Nelson and Leicy Loc. It spawned three singles: "4 tha E", a tribute song to Eazy-E, which peaked at #50 on the US Billboard Hot Rap Songs, "Dat's How I'm Livin'" and "Send 4 Me".

Yella never released any other solo material, and after the release he left the music industry to direct pornographic films until 2011, when he started working on a new album called West Coastin which currently has no information regarding the project since 2012. One of the reasons Yella made this album was to help raise money for college for nine of Eazy-E's children.

The album peaked at number 82 on the Billboard 200 albums chart and at number 23 on the Top R&B/Hip-Hop Albums chart in the United States.

Critical reception

The album was mildly received. AllMusic gave the album 3 stars while Bradley Torreano called it "a flop". Milwaukee Journal Sentinel's Cary Darling called it along with MC Ren's The Villain in Black (which was released two weeks later after the album's release) "ordinary by hard-core rap standards".

Track listing 

Sample credits
Track 4 contains elements from "Riding High" by Faze-O
Track 6 contains elements from "Gotta Find a Lover" by Roy Ayers Ubiquity
Track 8 contains elements from "Eazy-Duz-It" by Eazy-E
Track 10 is a cover of "Send for Me" by Atlantic Starr
Track 12 contains elements from "A Love of Your Own" by Average White Band and "Real Muthaphuckkin G's" by Eazy-E
Track 18 contains elements from "Moments in Love" by Art of Noise

Personnel
Antoine Carraby – vocals, producer, executive producer
Kevyn "Shaki" Carter – vocals (tracks: 2, 14)
Andre DeSean Wicker – vocals (track 4)
Jerry Buddy Long, Jr. – vocals (track 8)
Traci Nelson – vocals (track 10)
Arlandis Hinton – vocals (track 12)
Leicy Loc – vocals (track 16)
Mike "Crazy Neck" Sims – keyboards, guitar, bass
Stan Martin – trumpet, flugelhorn
Donovan "Tha Dirt Biker" Sound – co-producer, mixing, recording
Don "D-Dawg" Spratley – co-producer (track 18)
Brian "Big Bass" Gardner – mastering
David Michery – A&R, executive producer
Chuck Gullo – executive producer
Doug Haverty – art direction
Johnny Buzzerio – photography

Chart history

References

External links

1996 debut albums
Albums produced by DJ Yella